Events from the year 1989 in Michigan.

Top Michigan news stories
The Associated Press (AP) selected the top stories in Michigan for 1989 as follows:

 School financing debate, including voters' rejection of two school funding proposals on the November ballot.
 Efforts to combat drug abuse and trafficking, including the April 2 appointment of attorney Don Reisig as Michigan's "drug czar" and raids on hundreds of suspected crack houses in Detroit.
 Abortion controversies, including voters' rejection of the use of Medicaid funds for abortion, the Michigan House of Representatives' passage of a bill requiring girls under 18 to obtain parental consent to abortions, and clashes outside Michigan women's clinics.
 The September 22 drowning death of Leslie Ann Pluhar of Royal Oak after her 1987 Yugo automobile plunged into the water from the Mackinac Bridge.
 An October 4 proposal by the Michigan Low-Level Radioactive Waste Authority to establish a dumping site for all the low-level nuclear waste from seven states at a site in St. Clair, Lenawee, or Ontonagon County.
 The U.S. Supreme Court's November 13 deadlock in its review of a lower court ruling approving the joint operating agreement between the Detroit Free Press and The Detroit News.  With the legal challenge removed, the newspapers began joint publishing on November 27.
 First-degree murder charges filed against Lawrence DeLisle after he drove the family station wagon into the Detroit River in Wyandotte, resulting in the deaths of his four children. (DeLisle was found guilty after a trial in June 1990. He was given five life sentences for his actions. His appeals continued for a decade, but the conviction was upheld.)
 Prison construction to alleviated anticipated overcrowding.
 The November 29 decision by the U.S. Air Force to place 50 rail-based MX nuclear missiles at Wurtsmith Air Force Base in Oscoda, Michigan. The plan was to base the missiles at Wurtsmith to be deployed by rail across the northeastern lower peninsula in the event of a threat of war.
 The September 20 conviction in Kent County Circuit Court of nurse's aide Gwendolyn Graham in the 1987 suffocation deaths of five elderly patients at the Alpine Manor Nursing Home in Walker, Michigan.

Office holders

State office holders

 Governor of Michigan: James Blanchard (Democrat)
 Lieutenant Governor of Michigan: Martha Griffiths (Democrat) 
 Michigan Attorney General: Frank J. Kelley (Democrat)
 Michigan Secretary of State: Richard H. Austin (Democrat)
 Speaker of the Michigan House of Representatives: Lewis N. Dodak (Democrat)
 Majority Leader of the Michigan Senate: John Engler (Republican)
 Chief Justice, Michigan Supreme Court:

Mayors of major cities
 Mayor of Detroit: Coleman Young
 Mayor of Grand Rapids: Gerald R. Helmholdt
 Mayor of Flint: Matthew S. Collier
 Mayor of Lansing: Terry John McKane
 Mayor of Ann Arbor: Gerald Jernigan (Republican)

Federal office holders

 U.S. Senator from Michigan: Donald W. Riegle Jr. (Democrat)
 U.S. Senator from Michigan: Carl Levin (Democrat) 
 House District 1: John Conyers (Democrat)
 House District 2: Carl Pursell (Republican)
 House District 3: Howard Wolpe (Republican)
 House District 4: Fred Upton (Republican)
 House District 5: Harold S. Sawyer (Republican)
 House District 6: Bob Carr (Democrat)
 House District 7: Dale Kildee (Democrat)
 House District 8: J. Bob Traxler (Democrat)
 House District 9: Guy Vander Jagt (Republican)
 House District 10: Bill Schuette (Republican)
 House District 11: Robert William Davis (Republican)
 House District 12: David Bonior (Democrat)
 House District 13: George Crockett Jr. (Democrat)
 House District 14: Dennis M. Hertel (Democrat)
 House District 15: William D. Ford (Democrat)
 House District 16: John Dingell (Democrat)
 House District 17: Sander Levin (Democrat)
 House District 18: William Broomfield (Republican)

Population

Sports

Baseball
 1989 Detroit Tigers season – Under manager Sparky Anderson, the Tigers compiled a 59–103 record and finished seventh in American League East. The team's statistical leaders included Keith Moreland with a .299 batting average, Lou Whitaker with 28 home runs and 85 RBIs, Mike Henneman with 11 wins, and Frank Tanana with a 3.58 earned run average. 
 1989 Michigan Wolverines baseball team – Under head coach Bud Middaugh, the Wolverines compiled a 49–16 record.

American football
 1989 Detroit Lions season – Under head coach Wayne Fontes, the Lions compiled a 7–9 record and finished third in the NFC Central Division. The team's statistical leaders included Bob Gagliano with 1,671 passing yards, Barry Sanders with 1,470 rushing yards, Richard Johnson with 1,091 receiving yards, and Eddie Murray with 96 points scored.
 1989 Detroit Drive season – Under head coach Tim Marcum, the Drive compiled a 3–1 record and won ArenaBowl III on August 18 at Joe Louis Arena in Detroit. 
 1989 Michigan Wolverines football team – Under head coach Bo Schembechler, the Wolverines compiled a 10–2 record, lost to USC in the 1990 Rose Bowl, and were ranked No. 7 in the final AP Poll. The team's statistical leaders included Michael Taylor with 1,081 passing yards, Tony Boles with 839 rushing yards, Greg McMurtry with 711 receiving yards, and J. D. Carlson with 73 points scored.
 1989 Michigan State Spartans football team – Under head coach George Perles, the Spartans compiled an 8–4 record and were ranked No. 16 in the final AP Poll. The team's statistical leaders included Dan Enos with 2,066 passing yards, Blake Ezor with 1,299 rushing yards and 114 points scored, and Courtney Hawkins with 1,080 receiving yards.
 1989 Eastern Michigan Hurons football team – Under head coach Jim Harkema, the Hurons compiled a 7–3–1 record.
 1989 Central Michigan Chippewas football team – Under head coach Herb Deromedi, the Chippewas compiled a 5–5–1 record.
 1989 Western Michigan Broncos football team – Under head coach Al Molde, the Broncos compiled a 5–6 record.

Basketball
 1988–89 Detroit Pistons season – Under head coach Chuck Daly, the Pistons compiled a 63–19 record, finished first in the NBA's Central Division, beat the Celtics and Bulls in the playoffs, and swept the Los Angeles Lakers, four games to none, in the 1989 NBA Finals. The team's statistical leaders included  Isaiah Thomas with 1,458 points and 663 assists and Bill Laimbeer with 776 rebounds.
 1988–89 Michigan Wolverines men's basketball team – The Wolverines compiled a 30–7 and won the national championship at the 1989 NCAA Division I men's basketball tournament. The team's statistical leaders included Glen Rice with 949 points, Rumeal Robinson with 233 assists, and Loy Vaught with 296 rebounds. Glen Rice was named the NCAA Final Four Most Outstanding Player and the Big Ten Player of the Year. Bill Frieder, who had announced his decision to become head coach at Arizona State, was dismissed before the NCAA Tournament and replaced by assistant Steve Fisher.
 1988–89 Michigan State Spartans men's basketball team – Under head coach Jud Heathcote, the Spartans compiled an 18–15 record. Guard Steve Smith led the team in scoring (585 points) and rebounds (229); Ken Redfield led the team with 131 assists.

Ice hockey
 1988–89 Detroit Red Wings season – Under head coach Jacques Demers, the Red Wings compiled a 34–34–12 record and finished first in the NHL Norris Division. Steve Yzerman led the team with 65 goals, 90 assists, and 155 points. The team's goaltenders were Greg Stefan (46 games) and Glen Hanlon (39 games).
 1988–89 Michigan Wolverines men's ice hockey team – Under head coach Red Berenson, the Wolverines compiled a 22–15–4 record.

Other
 1988–89 Michigan Wolverines softball team – Under head coach Carol Hutchins, the team compiled a 42–20 record.
 1989 U.S. Women's Open – Betsy King won the championship which was held at Indianwood Golf and Country Club in Orion Township, Michigan.
 Detroit Turbos - Under head coach Medo Martinello, the Turbos compiled a 6-2 record in the inaugural season of the Major Indoor Lacrosse League. Gary Gait was selected as the league's rookie of the year.

Music and culture
 March 1989 - Madonna's album Like a Prayer was released and reached No. 1 on the Billboard album chart. The album featured hit songs Like a Prayer" (No. 1), "Express Yourself" (No. 2), "Cherish" (No. 2), and "Keep It Together" (No. 8).
 May 1989 - Aretha Franklin's Through the Storm was released. The single "Through the Storm", a duet with Elton John, reached No. 16 on the Billboard Hot 100.
 May 1989 - Bob Seger's remake of Fats Domino's "Blue Monday" was released on the Road House soundtrack album and reached No. 40 on the US Mainstream Rock chart.
 June 1989 - Diana Ross' album Workin' Overtime was released. The title track Workin' Overtime reached No. 3 on the Billboard R&B Singles chart.
 July 1989 - Alice Cooper's album Trash was released and reached No. 20 on the Billboard album chart. The single "Poison" reached No. 7 on the Billboard Hot 100.
 1989 - The Insane Clown Posse's first single, "Party at the Top of the Hill", was released.

Companies
The following is a list of major companies based in Michigan having at least $500 million in sales in 1989.

Chronology of events

January

February

March

April

May

June

July

August

September

October

November

December

Births
 January 4 - Joe Barksdale, American football player, in Detroit
 February 20 - Jack Falahee, actor (How to Get Away with Murder, Mercy Street), in Ann Arbor, Michigan
 February 21 - Ian Cole, professional ice hockey player, in Ann Arbor
 March 22 - Tyler Oakley, Youtuber, television host, author and activist, in Jackson, Michigan
 April 14 - Kayla Pedersen, WNBA forward, in Flint, Michigan
 May 24 - Grace Luczak, rower and 3x world championship gold medalist, in Royal Oak, Michigan
 October 2 - Kristina and Karissa Shannon,  glamour models, Playboy Playmates, and twin sisters, in Ann Arbor
 December 20 - Jennifer Song, professional golfer, in Ann Arbor
 December 21 - Mark Ingram II, American football player and 2009 Heisman Trophy winner who grew up and played high school football in Flint, in Hackensack, New Jersey

Gallery of 1989 births

Deaths
 February 2 - Oliver Sipple, Vietnam vet and Detroit native who stopped Sarah Jane Moore from shooting Gerald Ford, at age 47 in San Francisco
 March 13 - James G. O'Hara, represented Michigan's 7th and 12th Districts in the House of Representatives (1959-1977), at age 63 in Washington, D.C.
 April 6 - Elizabeth Becker-Pinkston, gold medalist in diving at 1924 and 1928 Summer Olympics, at age 86 in Detroit
 April 12 - Sugar Ray Robinson, professional boxer who grew up in Detroit, at age 67 in Los Angeles
 April 26 - Lucille Ball, actress and comedian who lived in Wyandotte, Michigan, for a portion of her childhood, at age 77 in Los Angeles
 May 20 - Gilda Radner, comedian, actress, and Detroit native, at age 42 in Los Angeles
 May 28 - Ralph Crego, Mayor Lansing from 1943 to 1961, at age 95 in East Lansing, Michigan
 June 7 - Jim Cristy, swimmer and bronze medalist at 1932 Summer Olympics, at age 76 in Kalamazoo
 July 2 - Wilfrid Sellars, philosopher, developer of critical realism, Ann Arbor native, and U-M alumnus, at age 77 in Pittsburgh
 September 22 - Bob Calihan, University of Detroit basketball coach (1948-1969) and namesake of Calihan Hall, at age 71
 October 8 - Edward Woods, actor (The Public Enemy'') and native of Menominee, MI, at age 86 in Van Nuys, California
 December 25 - Billy Martin, manager of the Detroit Tigers (1971-1973), at age 61 in Johnson City, New York
 December 26 - Doug Harvey, ice hockey legend who won the Norris Trophy seven times and played for the Detroit Red Wings during the 1966-67 season, at age 65 in Montreal

Gallery of 1989 deaths

See also
 History of Michigan
 History of Detroit

References